Nirmal Pandey (10 August 1962 – 18 February 2010) was an Indian Bollywood actor who was known for his role of Vikram Mallah in Shekhar Kapur's Bandit Queen (1994),and Dajjal in Television Series Hatim,  for portraying a transvestite in Daayraa (1996) for which he won a Best Actress Valenti award in France, Train To Pakistan (1998) and Godmother (1999).
He played Role of Kishan Bhatta in Malayalam language film Dubai (2001).

His last film Lahore which was  released on 19 March 2010, a month  after his death.

Early life and education
Born on 10 August 1962 in a Kumaoni family in Nainital, then in Uttar Pradesh, Nirmal Pandey was educated at Almora and Nainital. He graduated from the National School of Drama, Delhi.

Career
After leaving the National School of Drama he moved to London, with a theater group, Tara, performing plays like Heer Ranjha and Antigone, and acting in around 125 plays.

After doing two small roles, he first got noticed in Shekhar Kapur's Bandit Queen (1996). He received positive reviews for films like Amol Palekar's Daayra (Square Circle) (1996), Train To Pakistan (1998), Is Raat Ki Subah Nahin and Hum Tum Pe Marte Hain. He acted in movies like Laila, Pyaar Kiya Toh Darna Kya, One 2 ka 4 and Shikari and in several television serials, including Hatim, and Princess Dollie Aur Uska Magic Bag (2005) (Star Plus).
famous for his role in the movie "Hum Tumpe Marte Hain" , Fans love him for his "Dow Dow Diq Dow" move

In addition to being an actor, he was a singer who released an album called Jazba. In 2002, he directed Andhayug, a Hindi play written by noted playwright Dharamvir Bharati, which follows the 18 days following the Mahabharata war. It has a cast of 70 actors, all of whom belong to Sanvedna, a theatre group started by him in 1994.

He has an acting institute, "Fresh Talent Academy", in Ghaziabad  and conducts theatre workshops.

Awards
He holds an extremely unusual record for winning a Best Actress award, at the 1997 France's Valenciennes Film Festival for his portrayal of a transvestite in Amol Palekar's Daayraa (1996). He shared the Best Actress award with the female lead, Sonali Kulkarni, at the Valenciennes Film Festival (France, 1997).

Death
Nirmal Pandey died at the age of 47 on 18 February 2010, from a heart attack in Mumbai about 6 months before his 48th birthday

Filmography

Films

Television

References

External links

 Filmography Bollywood Hungama

1962 births
2010 deaths
Indian male film actors
Indian male stage actors
Indian male television actors
Male actors in Hindi cinema
National School of Drama alumni
Male actors from Mumbai
People from Nainital
Male actors from Uttarakhand
20th-century Indian male actors
21st-century Indian male actors
Male actors in Telugu cinema
Actors from Mumbai